Statistics and Informatics Division is a Bangladesh government department under the Planning Ministry responsible for analyzing statistics for the government and providing information. Saurendra Nath Chakrabhartty is the head of the division.

History
Statistics Division was established in 1975 and was tasked to oversee the Bangladesh Bureau of Statistics, which was formed in 1974. On 25 October 1999, "Parishangkhan Bhaban", the headquarters of the division was inaugurated by Prime Minister Sheikh Hasina. The division was abolished in 2002 and turned into a wing of the Ministry of Planning. In 2010, the division was recreated and in 2012 it was renamed to Statistics and Informatics Division.

References

1975 establishments in Bangladesh
Organisations based in Dhaka
Government agencies of Bangladesh
Government departments of Bangladesh